Tsiu Hang Special Area is a nature reserve in the Sai Kung District of Hong Kong. Covering 24 hectares, it was designated as a Special Area in 1987.

The special area is located at the north of the Pak Sha Wan Peninsula, in the Tsiu Hang area of Sai Kung District.

The Lions Nature Education Centre is located within the special area.

The Tsiu Hang Nature Trail is located within the special area.

References

Country parks and special areas of Hong Kong
Sai Kung District